This is the list of number-one tracks on the ARIA Club Chart in 2022, and is compiled by the Australian Recording Industry Association (ARIA) from weekly DJ reports.

2022

Number-one artists

See also
ARIA Charts
2022 in music

References

Number-one singles
Australia Club Chart
2022 Club